Eugene Francis Deckers (22 October 1917, in Antwerp – 1977, in Paris, France) was a Belgian actor.

Career

After establishing himself on the British stage, Deckers made his first English language film appearance in 1946. Formerly a romantic lead, he specialized in "continental" character roles, playing many an obsequious concierge and imperious diplomat. As he grew older, Eugene Deckers expanded his characterization range to include Germans and Italians as well as Frenchmen. One of his biggest and best roles was as the arms dealer Peters in North West Frontier (1959). Deckers appeared in Sheldon Reynolds television series Foreign Intrigue in the early-1950s. In 1954–55, Deckers played at least seven different characters in the French-filmed Sheldon Reynolds television series Sherlock Holmes. After appearing in over fifty film and television roles, Deckers made his final screen appearance in the 1969 film The Assassination Bureau. While working as an actor, Eugene Deckers also worked as a painter. He is the great uncle of singer Eliza Roe.

Filmography

 While the Sun Shines (1947) as Lieutenant Colbert
 Woman to Woman (1947) as De Rillac
 Dual Alibi (1947) as French Ringmaster
 Mrs. Fitzherbert (1947) as Philippe
 Against the Wind (1948) as Marcel Van Hecke
 Sleeping Car to Trieste (1948) as Jules
 Prince of Foxes (1949) as Borgia Henchman (uncredited)
 Golden Salamander (1950) as Police Chief
 Madeleine (1950) as Thuau
 So Long at the Fair (1950) as Day Porter
 Tony Draws a Horse (1950) as French Waiter (uncredited)
 The Elusive Pimpernel (1950) as Captain Merieres
 Highly Dangerous (1950) as Alf - the 'contact'
 Night Without Stars (1951) as Armand
 Captain Horatio Hornblower R.N. (1951) as French Commandant
 The Lavender Hill Mob (1951) as Customs Official
 Hotel Sahara (1951) as French Spahi Officer
 Foreign Intrigue (1953) as Various Roles
 The Love Lottery (1954) as Vernet
 Father Brown (1954) as French Cavalry Officer
 Sherlock Holmes (1954, TV) as Various Roles
 The Colditz Story (1955) as La Tour
 Doctor at Sea (1955) as Colonel Perello, chief of police
 Man of the Moment (1955) as Day Lift Man
 Colonel March of Scotland Yard (1956, TV) as Phillipe
 Women Without Men (1956) as Pierre
 Port Afrique (1956) as Colonel Moussac
 The Iron Petticoat (1956) as Bartender
 Foreign Intrigue (1956) as Sandoz
 House of Secrets (1956) as Vidal
 Let's Be Happy (1957) as Dining Car Attendant
 Seven Thunders (1957) as Emile Blanchard
 Law and Disorder (1958) as French Fisherman (uncredited)
 Le fauve est lâché (1959) as Toni Luigi
 North West Frontier (1959) as Peters
 Crack in the Mirror (1960) as Magre
 A Weekend with Lulu (1961) as Inspector Larue
 The Saint (1962, TV) as Inspector Quercy 
 The Longest Day (1962) as German Major In Church (uncredited)
 Blague dans le coin (1963) as Bennet
 Coplan Takes Risks (1964) 
 Lady L (1965) as Koenigstein
 The Rat Catchers (1966, TV) as Henri Dupont
 The Restaurant (1966) as Le complice de Novalès
 The Last Safari (1967) as Refugee Leader
 Hell Is Empty (1967) as Counsel
 The Limbo Line (1968) as Cadillet
 The Assassination Bureau (1969) as 'La Belle Amie' desk clerk (uncredited)

References

External links
 

1917 births
1977 deaths
Politicians from Antwerp
French male film actors
French male stage actors
French male television actors
Belgian male film actors
Belgian male stage actors
Belgian male television actors
20th-century French male actors